Aleksey Vakulich (born 24 June 1998) is a Belarusian professional footballer who plays for Dinamo Minsk.

References

External links 
 
 Profile at FC Minsk website 
 

1998 births
Living people
Belarusian footballers
Association football midfielders
Belarusian expatriate footballers
Expatriate footballers in Russia
FC Neman Grodno players
FC Minsk players
FC Energetik-BGU Minsk players
FC Baranovichi players
FC Smolevichi players
FC Veles Moscow players
FC Rukh Brest players
FC Dinamo Minsk players
Russian First League players